Port-Sainte-Foy-et-Ponchapt is a commune in the Dordogne department in Nouvelle-Aquitaine in southwestern France.

Population

See also
Communes of the Dordogne department

References

Communes of Dordogne